E 002 is a European B class road in Azerbaijan and Armenia, connecting the cities Alyat - Saatly Rayon - Megri - Ordubad - Julfa - Nakhchivan – Sadarak

Route 

: Ələt - Shirvan
: Shirvan - Saatli - Hozali - Mərcanlı - Mincivan - Aghband

: Aghband - Nrnadzor
: Nrnadzor - Meghri
: Meghri - Agarak

: Kilit - Ordubad - Julfa - Nakhchivan
: Nakhchivan - Sədərək
: Sədərək

: Yeraskh

External links 
 UN Economic Commission for Europe: Overall Map of E-road Network (2007)

International E-road network
Roads in Azerbaijan
Roads in Armenia